Hendekasartorite is a very rare thallium sulfosalt mineral with formula Tl2Pb48As82S172. It is one of recently approved new members of sartorite homologous series, by enneasartorite and heptasartorite. All new members come from Lengenbach quarry in Switzerland, prolific in terms of thallium sulfosalt minerals. Hendekasartorite is chemically similar to edenharterite and hutchinsonite.

References

Sulfosalt minerals
Thallium minerals
Lead minerals
Arsenic minerals
Monoclinic minerals
Minerals in space group 14